Shelby Chong (née Fiddis; born February 1, 1948) is an American comedian, actress and producer who was the executive producer of Best Buds (2003) and the associate producer of four Cheech & Chong films. She is the wife of comedian and actor Tommy Chong.

Early life
Shelby (Sharon) Fiddis was born in Los Angeles, California in 1948. She attended Gladstone Secondary School in Vancouver, BC from Grade 7 to 12, graduating in 1966.

Career
Interested in acting and comedy, she started performing in local clubs as a stand-up comedian.

Shelby Chong acted in Cheech & Chong's Next Movie (1980), Nice Dreams (1981) and Things Are Tough All Over (1982). She was associate producer for Still Smokin' (1983) and Cheech & Chong's The Corsican Brothers (1984). and in Far Out Man (1990)  as Tree.  Her notable acting roles include "Nancy Reynolds" in Sandman (1993), “Professor Jones” in Class of Nuke 'Em High 2: Subhumanoid Meltdown (1991), credited as “Shelby Shepherd”.

Shelby Chong performed as Tommy's opening act at his comedy shows from 1996 to 2000, when she became his comedy partner. Since Cheech and Chong's reunion in 2008, Shelby performed as their opening act at sold-out comedy shows on their cross-country tour.

Personal life
In 1975 in Los Angeles, Fiddis married Canadian actor and comedian Tommy Chong, becoming his second wife. They adopted Marcus Wyatt (b. 1967) in 1978. They have three additional children together: Precious (b. 1968), Paris (b. 1974), and Gilbran (b. 1981). Shelby Chong is the stepmother to Tommy's two daughters from his first marriage, Rae Dawn and Robbi.

Marcus took the surname of his adoptive parents and siblings when he turned eighteen. He and three of his sisters have each pursued acting careers, and his two brothers have acted in occasional family movie productions.

References

External links

 Miriam Valle, "Shelby Chong: Tommy Chong's Wife is Helping Cancer Battle", 10 June 2010, Daily Entertainment website

American film actresses
Film producers from California
Living people
1948 births
20th-century American actresses
21st-century American actresses
Actresses from Los Angeles
American women comedians
Comedians from California
American women film producers
20th-century American comedians
21st-century American comedians